Sweden competed at the 2014 Winter Olympics in Sochi, Russia, from 7 to 23 February 2014. The Swedish Olympic Committee (Swedish: Sveriges Olympiska Kommitté, SOK) sent 106 athletes to the Games, 61 men and 45 women, to compete in nine sports. 38 of the 98 events had Swedish participation. The youngest athlete in the delegation was freestyle skier Sandra Näslund, at 17 years old, while ice hockey player Daniel Alfredsson was the oldest athlete at 41. Alfredsson competed in his fifth Olympics, and he thus became the first Swedish ice hockey player that has participated in five Olympic tournaments. 55 athletes were Olympic debutants. Sweden won 15 medals in total, making the Sochi games Sweden's most successful Winter Games ever in terms of medals. However, the number of gold medals (2) was lower than in the two previous Winter Games.

Medalists

Summary 
On 8 February, the first competition day, cross-country skier Charlotte Kalla won the first Swedish medal at the Games. She won the silver medal in the women's 15 km skiathlon event, finishing behind Norway's Marit Bjørgen. Snowboarder Sven Thorgren finished in fourth place in the men's slopestyle, just 1.25 points behind the bronze medalist.

The second medal came the second day, 9 February. Defending Olympic champion Marcus Hellner won the silver medal in the men's 30 km skiathlon behind gold medalist Dario Cologna of Switzerland.

After a chaotic cross-country sprint final on 11 February, Teodor Peterson and Emil Jönsson could pinch a medal each, silver and bronze respective. It was Sweden's third and fourth medal at the Games, all won in cross-country skiing. Marcus Hellner also participated in the final, but finished in sixth place after a fall. In the women's final, Ida Ingemarsdotter finished fifth. Another fifth place was obtained by Emma Dahlström, in the women's slopestyle final.

On 13 February, Charlotte Kalla won her second silver medal of the games, outraced only by gold medal winner Justyna Kowalczyk in the women's 10 km classical. Henrik Harlaut finished 6th in the men's slopestyle.

On 14 February, Johan Olsson and Daniel Richardsson added yet another silver medal, as well as another bronze medal, to the Swedish cross-country team's medal tally in the men's 15 km classical. Richardsson edged Iivo Niskanen of Finland by two tenths of a second to win the bronze.

15 February saw Sweden's first gold medal as Charlotte Kalla overcame a 25-second deficit in the fourth leg of the women's relay, and raced past Krista Lähteenmäki of Finland and Denise Herrmann of Germany in the home stretch. In ice hockey, Sweden's women's team qualified for the semi-finals after defeating Finland with 4–2 in the quarterfinal.

The second gold medal came on 16 February, as Marcus Hellner completed a strong team effort in the men's relay, crossing the finish line almost half a minute ahead of silver medalists Russia. Sweden's men's curling team qualified for the semi-finals after finishing with an 8–1 record in the round robin.

On 17 February, Sweden's women's ice hockey team lost their semifinal against United States with 6–1. Sweden's women's curling team qualified for the semifinals after finishing with a 7–2 record in the round robin.

On 18 February, alpine skier Maria Pietilä Holmner finished 6th in women's giant slalom. Fredrik Lindström also finished 6th, in the men's mass start event in biathlon.

Sweden gained two bronze medals on 19 February, when the team sprint finals were conducted. Stina Nilsson overtook German skier Denise Herrmann in the home stretch to secure her and Ida Ingemarsdotter's bronze medal in the women's event. Emil Jönsson and Teodor Peterson gained the bronze medal in the men's event after German skier Tim Tscharnke fell late in the race. In curling, the Swedish women's team won their semifinal against Switzerland's team with 7–5. The men's team however lost their semifinal against Great Britain's team with 5–6. In ice hockey, the Swedish team won their quarterfinal against Slovenia with 5–0 and qualified for the semifinals.

The first Swedish medal outside the cross-country skiing events was earned on 20 February, after the Swedish women's curling team lost their final game against Canada with the score 3–6. In women's ice hockey, Sweden lost the bronze medal game against Switzerland with 3–4, finishing fourth.

An additional curling medal was earned on 21 February after Niklas Edin's team won the bronze medal game in men's curling after defeating China with 6–4. Anna Holmlund won a bronze, and Sandra Näslund finished 5th, in women's ski cross. Sweden's men's ice hockey team secured a place in the final after defeating Finland with 2–1 in the semi-finals. In alpine skiing, Frida Hansdotter finished 5th and Emelie Wikström 6th in women's slalom.

In the men's ice hockey tournament, Sweden won silver, losing the final match to Canada 0–3 on the final day of the Olympics, on 23 February.

Alpine skiing 

Men

Women

Biathlon 

Christoffer Eriksson was also selected as a reserve.

Cross-country skiing 

Distance
Men

Women

Sprint
Men

Women

Simon Persson was also selected but did not participate in any of the events.

Curling 

Summary

Men's tournament

Team: Niklas Edin, Sebastian Kraupp, Viktor Kjäll, Fredrik Lindberg and Oskar Eriksson (reserve)

Round Robin

Round-robin

Draw 1

Draw 2

Draw 3

Draw 4

Draw 5

Draw 6

Draw 7

Draw 8

Draw 9

Semifinal

Bronze medal game

Women's tournament

Team: Margaretha Sigfridsson, Maria Prytz, Christina Bertrup, Maria Wennerström and Agnes Knochenhauer (reserve)

Round Robin

Round-robin

Draw 1

Draw 2

Draw 3

Draw 4

Draw 5

Draw 6

Draw 7

Draw 8

Draw 9

Semifinal

Gold medal game

Figure skating

Freestyle skiing 

Moguls

Ski cross

Qualification legend: FA – Qualify to medal round; FB – Qualify to consolation round

Slopestyle

Ice hockey 

Summary

Men's tournament

Roster

Group stage

Quarterfinal

Semifinal

Gold medal game

Women's tournament

Roster

Group stage

Quarterfinal

Semifinal

Bronze medal game

Snowboarding 

Freestyle

Qualification Legend: QF – Qualify directly to final; QS – Qualify to semifinal

Speed skating 

Men

See also
Sweden at the 2014 Summer Youth Olympics
Sweden at the 2014 Winter Paralympics

References

External links 

Sweden at the 2014 Winter Olympics
Swedish Olympic Team

Nations at the 2014 Winter Olympics
2014
Winter Olympics